John Stanfield (born May 30, 1942) is a Canadian former professional ice hockey forward who played a single game in the National Hockey League for the Chicago Black Hawks.  He would also play 112 games in the World Hockey Association with the Houston Aeros over two seasons.

Jack also played over a decade in the minor leagues. He is the oldest brother of the late Fred Stanfield and the late Jim Stanfield, both of whom also played professional hockey.

Stanfield was born in Toronto, Ontario.

See also
List of players who played only one game in the NHL
List of family relations in the NHL

References

External links
 

1942 births
Canadian ice hockey forwards
Chicago Blackhawks players
Houston Aeros (WHA) players
Living people
Macon Whoopees (SHL) players
Ice hockey people from Toronto
World Hockey Association broadcasters